Since the inception of international association football matches in 1872, nine Croatian footballers have scored three or more goals (a hat-trick) in a game.  The first player to score a hat-trick for Croatia was August Lešnik in a friendly match against Slovakia in 1942. Davor Šuker was the first player in modern Croatian national team history to achieve this feat, scoring three times in a 7–1 victory over Estonia in 1995. He is also the one of two players alongside Mario Mandžukić who scored a hat-trick more than once, grabbing his second hat-trick in Croatia's 7–0 win against Australia. Mladen Petrić has scored the greatest number of goals in one game, netting four times against Andorra. 

The most recent hat-trick was scored by Mario Mandžukić in Croatia's 6–0 victory over Kosovo in the 2018 FIFA World Cup qualification campaign.

Croatia have conceded four hat-tricks since 1941, the most recent being scored by Theo Walcott in a 4–1 defeat by England in the qualifications for the 2010 FIFA World Cup. The other three hat-tricks were scored by Ján Arpáš, Primož Gliha and Zlatan Muslimović.

Hat-tricks for Croatia
4 - player has scored 4 goals

Hat-tricks conceded by Croatia

Notes

 The result is presented with Croatia's score first.

References

Croatia
Croatia
Hat-tricks